New Winchester is a ghost town in Licking County, in the U.S. state of Ohio.

History
By 1917, New Winchester was described as "virtually extinct".

References

Geography of Licking County, Ohio
Ghost towns in Ohio